Vishenki is a rural locality (a selo) in Seletskoye Rural Settlement, Suzdalsky District, Vladimir Oblast, Russia. The population was 18 as of 2010. There are 2 streets.

Geography 
Vishenki is located 13 km northwest of Suzdal (the district's administrative centre) by road. Kistysh is the nearest rural locality.

References 

Rural localities in Suzdalsky District